The Kreuzkapelle is a chapel of the Holy Cross, a Catholic pilgrimage church in Bad Camberg, Hesse, Germany, dedicated to the Holy Cross. It is a landmark of the town, located on higher ground to the north-east. A Kreuzweg with stations of the Cross leads from Bad Camberg to the chapel.

History 
The chapel was built from 1681 to 1683 on a ridge running north-east out of Bad Camberg, overlooking the  area and the town.

The chapel was first built as an octagon located where the choir is now. It was expanded in 1725 to a symmetrical central building (Zentralbau) shaped like a Greek cross. While three of its arms are closed on floor level, the choir is elevated and can be reached by symmetrical stairs. It is dominated by a crucifix. A crypt below the choir is hewn in the rock, holding the shrine of a cross relic. 

The upper church features wooden vaults, and several altars from the 18th century. The meadow around the chapel and the sexton's house is surrounded by a wall with eight sides.  Seven stations of the cross along the Kreuzweg, by the Hadamar school of sculpture, are replicas of weathered originals which are held in the crypt. Stained glass windows, donated by citizens of Camberg, were added around 1900.

The chapel was a centre of the Catholic youth movement until 1933. Exterior and interior were restored by volunteers from 1975. The chapel is a landmark of Bad Camberg. When the anniversary of the building was celebrated in 1982, a priest wrote that the chapel is a sermon about the cross, and believers come bringing the "crosses" in their lives. 

The building is listed in the Hague Convention for protection in the event of armed conflict.

References 

Roman Catholic churches in Hesse
Pilgrimage churches in Germany
Roman Catholic churches completed in 1683
Octagonal churches
Churches in the Diocese of Limburg
17th-century Roman Catholic church buildings in Germany